Lakhan Raja (born 15 October 1994) is an Indian cricketer. He made his first-class debut on 3 January 2020, for Bihar in the 2019–20 Ranji Trophy. He made his List A debut on 24 February 2021, for Bihar in the 2020–21 Vijay Hazare Trophy.

References

External links
 

1994 births
Living people
Indian cricketers
Bihar cricketers
Place of birth missing (living people)